Emperor Pedro I of Brazil founded the National Order of the Southern Cross as a Brazilian order of chivalry on 1 December 1822. The order aimed to commemorate the independence of Brazil (7 September 1822) and the coronation of Pedro I (1 December 1822). The name derives from the geographical position of the country, under the constellation of the Southern Cross and also in memory of the name – Terra de Santa Cruz (Land of the Holy Cross) – given to Brazil following its first arrival by Europeans in 1500.

History
Originally known as the Imperial Order of the Cross (Ordem Imperial do Cruzeiro), the Order was created by Emperor Pedro I on the day of his Coronation, 1 December 1822. Also on the same date the first knights of the order were appointed, to commemorate the crowning of the Empire's first monarch. After the proclamation of the independence of Brazil on 7 September 1822 other honorific awards had been made, but of the Orders of chivalry shared with Portugal, Brazilian branches of which had been created upon independence; the Order of the Cross, created to mark the Coronation of the Empire's founder, was thus also the first purely Brazilian Order.

After the fall of the monarchy, Brazil's first republican Constitution, enacted on 24 February 1891, abolished all titles of nobility and all Imperial Orders and decorations. The Order was later re-established by the government of Getúlio Vargas on December 5, 1932, as the National Order of the Southern Cross. 

During the Old Republic period (from the Proclamation of the Republic until the Revolution of 1930), National Orders did not exist and the Brazilian State bestowed only military medals. Restored in 1932, the Order of the Southern Cross was the first Order to be created in the re-established, republican honours system. It is considered the senior Brazilian National Order.

During the Imperial period, the Order of the Southern Cross was not the highest ranking of the Imperial Orders, as it ranked below the Brazilian branches of the ancient orders of chivalry, that originated with Portugal: the Order of Christ (the senior-most Order), the Order of Saint Benedict of Aviz and the Order of St. James of the Sword. Those Orders were shared by Brazil and Portugal; the Order of Christ was shared with the Holy See similar to the Austrian and a Spanish Orders of the Golden Fleece. However among the Brazilian created Orders, the Imperial Order of the Cross ranked first, having higher status than the Imperial Order of Pedro I and the Imperial Order of the Rose.

The Imperial Order of the Cross continues to be used by both branches of the Brazilian Imperial Family as a House Order, awarded by the rival claimants to the position of Head of the Imperial Family, but such awards are not recognized by the Republic of Brazil.

Just like the Emperors of Brazil were ex officio Grand Masters of the Imperial Order, Presidents of Brazil are ex officio Grand Masters of the successor National Order. Accordingly, President Luiz Inácio Lula da Silva is the Order's current Grand Master.

Criteria

Unlike the Imperial Order, that was awarded to Brazilians and foreigners alike, the republican National Order is awarded to foreigners only. When the Order was re-established in by presidential decree on January 13, 1932, it was restricted to foreigners only with the stipulation that all awards of the Order constitute an act of foreign relations on the part of the Brazilian Government.

Brazilians were excluded deliberately. In the Old Republic, the State regarded Orders and decorations as contrary to the principles of republicanism, and thus maintained no honours system; the creation of an Order that would admit Brazilians to its ranks was a step too far. However, the Brazilian State also resented the lack of a decoration with which to honour foreign dignitaries, as is sometimes almost required by diplomatic protocol. For instance, during the celebrations of the Centennial of Brazilian Independence in 1922, several foreign dignitaries, including the King and Queen of the Belgians, came to Brazil for the celebrations. The King of the Belgians bestowed Belgian honours to some Brazilians. Brazilian nationals needed authorization from the Government to accept foreign titles of honour, or else face loss of citizenship, and under normal circumstances permission for the acceptance of appointment to Orders of Chivalry would not have been granted. While the government of Brazil relaxed its practice and authorized both accepting induction into foreign Orders and the wearing of foreign insignia, it lacked any decorations with which to reciprocate the Belgian gesture. The National Order of the Southern Cross was intended as an Order that would fill that gap. Today, accepting foreign honours and insignia without the need of prior Government approval is allowed, and several Brazilian Orders have been established to which Brazilians may be admitted, starting with the National Order of Merit (Ordem Nacional do Mérito), created in 1946. Even so, the governing statutes of the National Order of the Southern Cross have never been reformed, and it thus remains unavailable to Brazilians. Paradoxically, therefore, the Order's Grand Master — the sitting President of the Republic — is never a member of the Order he or she oversees, and the President's connection with the Order is severed once the President leaves office.

The Decree that re-created the Order (Decree 22.165, signed by Vargas on 5 December 1932) does not mention the creation of a new Order, but the reestablishment of the old Order of the Southern Cross, that had been "created upon the advent of the political independence of Brazil". This was done to improve the prestige of the Order by linking it with the past, that is, by associating it with an Order that had been created more than one century earlier.

In 1932, the republican version of the Order had the same five grades as the old imperial version. In 1939, by a statute issued on 17 July of that year, the additional grade of the Grand Collar was created. Until the creation of the Grand Collar, awards of which are restricted to Heads of State, the Grand Cross was the Order's highest rank.

Awards of, and promotions in, the National Order of the Southern Cross are made by decree of the President of the Republic, in his capacity as the Order's Grand Master. The decree of appointment or promotion is, like all presidential decrees, published in the Federal Government's Official Journal, and, as per the Order's regulations, the appointment or promotion is also recorded in a book kept by the Order's secretary.

The Brazilian Minister of Foreign Relations serves as the Chancellor of the Order, and an officer of the Ministry of Foreign Relations that heads the ceremonial and protocol division serves as the Secretary to the Order. The Order also has a Council, chaired by its Chancellor, that recommends awards and promotions.

Classes

Under its current regulations, the Order consists of the Grand Master and six Classes of members:
 Grand Collar: the recipient wears the adorned "Grand Collar", a chain from which the badge of the order is suspended. The recipient is also allowed to combine the wearing of the Grand Collar with any of the following insignia, or with both: the "Star" of the Order (a plaque modelled after the badge of the Order, to be worn on the left breast); and the Sash of the Order, that is proper to those of Grand Cross rank (a light blue sash, to be worn on the right shoulder). Awards of the Grand Collar are restricted to foreign Heads of State.
 Grand Cross: the recipient wears the Sash of the Order, and the badge of the Order hangs from the bottom part of that sash (given that the sash is worn on the right shoulder, the badge hangs close to the left leg, by the waist line). The recipient further wears the "star" of the Order, displayed on the left breast.
 Grand Officer: the recipient wears the badge of the Order around the neck suspended from a blue ribbon necklet, and the star of the order is displayed on the left breast.
 Commander: the recipient wears the badge of the order around the neck, suspended from a blue ribbon necklet.
 Officer: the recipient wears the badge of the Order on left breast suspended from a ribbon with a rosette.
 Knight: the recipient wears the badge of the Order on the left breast suspended from a simple ribbon.

Notable recipients

Foreigners

 2021 –  Hamad Bin Isa Al Khalifa (King of Bahrain)
 2021 –  Tamim bin Hamad Al Thani (Emir of Qatar)
 2021 –  Mohammed bin Zayed Al Nahyan (President of the United Arab Emirates and Ruler of the Emirate of Abu Dhabi)
 2021 –  Mohammed bin Rashid Al Maktoum (Emir of Dubai)
 2021 –  Khalifa bin Zayed Al Nahyan (President of the United Arab Emirates)
 2021 –  Iván Duque (President of Colombia)
 2020 –  Taro Aso (Prime Minister of Japan)
 2020 –  Shinzo Abe (Prime Minister of Japan)
 2018 –  Benjamin Netanyahu (Prime Minister of Israel)
 2017 –  Horacio Cartes (President of Paraguay)
 2017 –  Stefan Zweig (novelist, playwright, journalist and biographer), posthumous award
 2017 –  Mauricio Macri (President of Argentina)
 2016 –  Rosen Plevneliev (President of Bulgaria)
 2015 –  Cristina Fernández de Kirchner (President of Argentina)
 2015 –  Enrique Peña Nieto (President of Mexico)
 2014 –  Julio de Vido (politician)
 2013 –  José Antonio Abreu (pianist)
 2012 –  Emmanuel Macron (later President of France)
 2011 –  Georgi Parvanov (President of Bulgaria)
 2011 –  María Ángela Holguín (Minister of Foreign Affairs of Colombia)
 2010 –  Bashar al-Assad (President of Syria)
 2010 –  Michel Suleiman (President of Lebanon)
 2009 –  Nicolas Sarkozy  (President of France)
 2009 –  Arturo Valenzuela (Assistant Secretary of State for Western Hemisphere Affairs)
 2007 –   Anders Fogh Rasmussen (Prime Minister of Denmark)
 2007 –  Carl XVI Gustaf (King of Sweden)
 2007 –  Silvia Sommerlath (Queen consort of Sweden)
 2007 –  Henri (Grand Duke of Luxembourg)
 2007 –  Maria Teresa (Grand Duchess consort of Luxembourg)
 2006 –  Jacques Diouf (diplomat)
 2004 –  James Sherwood (businessman)
 2004 –  Mohammed VI (King of Morocco)
 2003 –  Beatrix (Queen of the Netherlands)
 2003 –  Harald V (King of Norway)
 2003 –  Sonja Haraldsen (Queen consort of Norway)
 2003 –  Yasuo Tanaka (governor of Nagano)
 2003 –  Ann Hartness (scholar)
 2002 –  Ismael Crespo (Professor at the University of Murcia, Murcia, Spain)
 2002 –  Aleksander Kwaśniewski (President of Poland)
 1999 –  Alberto Fujimori (President of Peru)
 1999 –  Albert Fishlow (professor)
 1999 –  Giovanni Sartori (political scientist)
 1998 –  Ricardo Salgado (banker)
 1998 –  Manuel Fraga (president of Galicia)
 1996 –  Jacques Chirac (President of France)
 1996 –  António Guterres (Prime Minister of Portugal)
 1996 –  Stephan Schmidheiny (entrepreneur)
 1995 –  Ronald Venetiaan (President of Suriname) 
 1991 -  Sofía of Spain  (Queen consort of Spain)
 1991 –  Juan Carlos I (King of Spain)
 1990 –  Václav Havel (President of Czechoslovakia)
 1990 –  Daisaku Ikeda (president of the Soka Gakkai)
 1987 –  Mário Soares (President of Portugal)
 1984 –  Kiyoshi Sumiya (Ambassador of Japan)
 1978 –  Charles, Prince of Wales (later Charles III, King of the United Kingdom and the other Commonwealth realms)
 1976 –  Masayoshi Ōhira (Finance Minister of Japan)
 1976 –  Valéry Giscard d'Estaing (President of France)
 1975 –  Nicolae Ceausescu (President of Romania)
 1974 –  Margrethe II (Queen of Denmark)
 1972 –  Hugo Banzer (President of Bolivia)
 1972 –  Alexander II Karađorđević (Crown Prince of Yugoslavia)
 1969 –  Neil Armstrong (astronaut)
 1969 –  Michael Collins (astronaut)
 1968 –  Elizabeth II (Queen of the United Kingdom and the other Commonwealth realms)
 1965 –  Mohammad Reza Pahlavi (Shah of Iran)
 1964 –  Charles de Gaulle (President of France)
 1964 –  Felix Grant (radio presenter)
 1963 –  Blaže Koneski (writer)
 1963 –  Ivan Rukavina  (Army general)
 1963 –  Josip Broz Tito (President of Yugoslavia)
 1962 –  Prince Philip, Duke of Edinburgh (consort of the British monarch)
 1961 –  Che Guevara (revolutionary)
1961 –  Yuri Gagarin (cosmonaut)
 1960 –  Sarit Thanarat (Prime Minister of Thailand)
 1960 –  Bhumibol Adulyadej (King of Thailand)
 1958 –  Haile Selassie (Emperor of Ethiopia)
 1956 –  David Rockefeller (banker) 
 1956 –  Sukarno (President of Indonesia)
 1955 –  Hirohito (Emperor of Japan)
 1954 –  Dwight D. Eisenhower (Supreme Commander WWII, President of the United States)
 1954 –  Vera Weizmann (wife of Chaim Weizmann, the first President of Israel)
 1952 –  Helen Keller (activist)
 1952 –  Eva Perón (First Lady of Argentina)
 1946 –  Nelson Rockefeller (as Assistant Secretary of State for American Republic Affairs, later U.S. Vice President)
 1944 –  Charles Lyon Chandler (historian)
 1944 –  Chiang Kai-shek (Chairman of the National Government of China)
 1944 –  Ira C. Eaker (general of the United States Army Air Forces)
 1944 –  Douglas Fairbanks Jr. (Naval officer)
 1940 –  Eleazar López Contreras (President of Venezuela)
 1940 –  Robert B. Williams (pilot)
 1935 –  Jean Batten (aviator)
 1933 –  Edward, Prince of Wales (later Edward VIII, King of the United Kingdom and the British Dominions, Emperor of India)
 1884 –  Nicholas II (Emperor of Russia)
 1878 –  Wilhem II (German Emperor and King of Prussia) 
 1873 –  Carlos I (King of Portugal and the Algarves)
 1871 –  Albert Edward, Prince of Wales, (later Edward VII, King of the United Kingdom and the British Dominions, Emperor of India)
 1867 –  Prince Alfred (Duke of Saxe-Coburg and Gotha)
 1866 –  Alexander III (Emperor of Russia)
 1865 –  Maximilian I (Emperor of Mexico)
 1864 –  Gaston, Count of Eu (French prince)
 1861 –  Luís I (King of Portugal and the Algarves)
 1855 –  Pedro V (King of Portugal and the Algarves)
 1852 –  Domingo Faustino Sarmiento (President of Argentina)
 1848 –  Isabella II (Queen of Spain)
 1838 –  Fernando II (King of Portugal and the Algarves)
 1830 –  Francis II & I (Holy Roman Emperor and Emperor of Austria)
 1830 –  Marie Louise (Duchess of Parma, former Empress of the French)
 1830 –  Domingos Sequeira (artist)
 1826 –  John Pascoe Grenfell (admiral)
 1826 –  Maria II (Queen of Portugal and the Algarves)
 1823 –  Thomas Cochrane, 10th Earl of Dundonald (admiral)
among others

Brazilians
 1888 –  Afonso Celso, Viscount of Ouro Preto (Prime Minister of Brazil)
 1876 –  José Paranhos, Baron of Rio Branco (Diplomat)
 1870 –  José Paranhos, Viscount of Rio Branco (Prime Minister of Brazil)
 1866 –  Francisco Manuel Barroso, Baron of Amazonas (Admiral)
 1870 –  Deodoro da Fonseca (Marshal)
 1869 –  Manuel Luís Osório, Marquis of Erval (Marshal)
 1852 –  Manuel Marques de Sousa, Count of Porto Alegre (Lieutenant general)
 1841 –  Luís Alves de Lima e Silva, Duke of Caxias (Marshal)
 1841 –  Honório Hermeto Carneiro Leão, Marquis of Paraná (Prime Minister of Brazil)
 1837 –  Pedro de Araújo Lima, Marquis of Olinda (Regent of the Empire)
 1824 –  Carlos Frederico Lecor, Viscount of Laguna (Governor of the Cisplatina province)

among others

Cities
 2016 –  Medellín (Honorable support due LaMia Flight 2933 accident)

 Grand Collars
 Akihito
 Bashar al-Assad
 List of titles and honours of Beatrix of the Netherlands
 Andrew Bertie
 Felipe Calderón
 Carl XVI Gustaf
 Jacques Chirac
 Francesco Cossiga
 List of titles and honours of Elizabeth II
 Charles de Gaulle
 Valéry Giscard d'Estaing
 Haile Selassie
 Harald V of Norway
 Václav Havel
 Henri, Grand Duke of Luxembourg
 Theodor Heuss
 List of titles and honours of Juan Carlos I of Spain
 Juliana of the Netherlands
 Aleksander Kwaśniewski
 Mauricio Macri
 Margrethe II of Denmark
 Mohammed VI of Morocco
 Mohammad Reza Pahlavi
 Enrique Peña Nieto
 Rosen Plevneliev
 Mário Soares
 Ronald Venetiaan
 Grand Crosses
 Prince Adalbert of Prussia (1811–1873)
 Archduke Albrecht, Duke of Teschen
 Prince Albert Victor, Duke of Clarence and Avondale
 Alexander III of Russia
 Alfred, Duke of Saxe-Coburg and Gotha
 Luís Alves de Lima e Silva, Duke of Caxias
 Amha Selassie
 Henry H. Arnold
 Prince August Leopold of Saxe-Coburg and Gotha
 Prince August of Saxe-Coburg and Gotha
 Jan Peter Balkenende
 Baudouin of Belgium
 Maximilian de Beauharnais, 3rd Duke of Leuchtenberg
 Prince Oscar Bernadotte
 Prince Bernhard of Lippe-Biesterfeld
 Friedrich Ferdinand von Beust
 Carlos I of Portugal
 Maria Cavaco Silva
 Archduke Charles, Duke of Teschen
 List of titles and honours of Charles, Prince of Wales
 Carlo Azeglio Ciampi
 Constantine, Prince of Hohenzollern-Hechingen
 Rohan Daluwatte
 Aida Desta
 Fernando de Quintanilha e Mendonça Dias
 Jacques Diouf
 Edward VIII
 Dwight D. Eisenhower
 Ferdinand I of Austria
 Ferdinand II of Portugal
 Cristina Fernández de Kirchner
 Francis II, Holy Roman Emperor
 François d'Orléans, Prince of Joinville
 Wacław Frankowski
 Archduke Franz Karl of Austria
 Frederick III, German Emperor
 Frederik, Crown Prince of Denmark
 Gaston, Count of Eu
 Che Guevara
 Gustaf V
 Gustaf VI Adolf
 António Guterres
 Haakon, Crown Prince of Norway
 Walter Hallstein
 Tarja Halonen
 Sir Arthur Harris, 1st Baronet
 Henri, Grand Duke of Luxembourg
 Henrik, Prince Consort of Denmark
 Hirohito
 Ja'afar of Negeri Sembilan
 Prince Joachim of Denmark
 Jacek Junosza-Kisielewski
 Karl Anton, Prince of Hohenzollern
 Archduke Karl Ludwig of Austria
 Thanat Khoman
 Knud, Hereditary Prince of Denmark
 Konstantin of Hohenlohe-Schillingsfürst
 François Lefebvre de Laboulaye
 Curtis LeMay
 Leopold I of Belgium
 Prince Leopold, Duke of Albany
 Charles de Limburg Stirum
 Erling Lorentzen
 Prince Ludwig August of Saxe-Coburg and Gotha
 Luís I of Portugal
 Luiz Inácio Lula da Silva
 Maria II of Portugal
 Maria Teresa, Grand Duchess of Luxembourg
 Princess Marina of Greece and Denmark
 Mary, Crown Princess of Denmark
 Queen Máxima of the Netherlands
 Maximilian I of Mexico
 Mette-Marit, Crown Princess of Norway
 Miguel I of Portugal
 Napoleon III
 Nicholas II of Russia
 Oscar II
 Georgi Parvanov
 Pedro V of Portugal
 Prince Pedro Augusto of Saxe-Coburg and Gotha
 Eva Perón
 Friis Arne Petersen
 List of titles and honours of Prince Philip, Duke of Edinburgh
 Prince Philippe, Count of Flanders
 Józef Piłsudski
 Francisco Pinto Balsemão
 Princess Ragnhild, Mrs. Lorentzen
 Archduke Rainer Ferdinand of Austria
 Anders Fogh Rasmussen
 Rudolf, Crown Prince of Austria
 Nicolas Sarkozy
 Queen Silvia of Sweden
 List of titles and honours of Queen Sofía of Spain
 Queen Sonja of Norway
 Sukarno
 Jan Szembek (diplomat)
 Sarit Thanarat
 Frans Timmermans
 Josip Broz Tito
 Umberto Vattani
 Victoria, Crown Princess of Sweden
 Wilhelm II, German Emperor
 Wilhelmina of the Netherlands
 William I, German Emperor
 Elmo Zumwalt
 Grand Officers
 Mark W. Clark
 Ira C. Eaker
 Tim Fischer
 Wallace M. Greene
 Emmanuel Macron
 William R. Munroe
 Henry Conger Pratt
 Benoît Puga
 Kiyoshi Sumiya
 Commanders
 Howard H. J. Benson
 Asa White Kenney Billings
 James H. Billington
 Hélène Carrère d'Encausse
 Charles Lyon Chandler
 Chiang Kai-shek
 Ismael Crespo
 Duarte de Freitas do Amaral
 Jean-Louis Georgelin
 Ann Hartness
 Henry Kent Hewitt
 Daisaku Ikeda
 Claude Lévi-Strauss
 Charles P. Mason
 Ghillean Prance
 Dorrit Reventlow
 David Rockefeller
 Dominique Vian
 Officers
 Jean Batten
 Jérôme Champagne
 Douglas Fairbanks Jr.
 Jean-Baptiste Nothomb
 Robert Olds
 Honório Hermeto Carneiro Leão, Marquis of Paraná
 Jean-François Revel
 Knights
 Gunnar Ring Amundsen
 Harold L. George
 José Paranhos, Baron of Rio Branco
 Peter Ustinov
 Unknown Class
 José Antonio Abreu
 Konrad Adenauer
 Bhumibol Adulyadej
 Alexander, Crown Prince of Yugoslavia
 Neil Armstrong
 Arie Aroch
 Hugo Banzer
 José Luís Mena Barreto
 Francisco Manuel Barroso, Baron of Amazonas
 Beatrix of the Netherlands
 Jeanne Behrend
 Juan Carlos I
 Horacio Cartes
 Nicolae Ceaușescu
 Charles, Prince of Wales
 Thomas Cochrane, 10th Earl of Dundonald
 Michael Collins (astronaut)
 Eleazar López Contreras
 Gabriel P. Disosway
 Louis Dreller
 Elizabeth II
 Albert Fishlow
 Deodoro da Fonseca
 Alberto Fujimori
 Yuri Gagarin
 Felix Grant
 John Pascoe Grenfell
 Tarja Halonen
 María Ángela Holguín
 Maria Quitéria
 António Horta-Osório (banker)
 Jonas H. Ingram
 Isabella II of Spain
 Helen Keller
 Blaže Koneski
 Carlos Frederico Lecor, Viscount of Laguna
 Pedro de Araújo Lima, Marquis of Olinda
 Marie Louise, Duchess of Parma
 City of Medellín
 Benjamin Netanyahu
 Masayoshi Ōhira
 Manuel Luís Osório, Marquis of Erval
 Afonso Celso, Viscount of Ouro Preto
 José Paranhos, Viscount of Rio Branco
 Pedro II of Brazil
 Prince Philip, Duke of Edinburgh
 William Alfred Pickwoad
 Manuel Marques de Sousa, Count of Porto Alegre
 Juan Rivero Torres
 Nelson Rockefeller
 Ivan Rukavina
 Ricardo Salgado
 Domingo Faustino Sarmiento
 Giovanni Sartori
 Stephan Schmidheiny
 Domingos Sequeira
 James Sherwood
 Stanisław Skarżyński
 Queen Sofía of Spain
 Maurice Strong
 Michel Suleiman
 Yasuo Tanaka (politician)
 Shoichiro Toyoda
 Arturo Valenzuela
 Julio de Vido
 Lech Wałęsa
 Vera Weizmann
 Robert B. Williams (general)
 Stefan Zweig

References

External links

Ordem Nacional do Cruzeiro do Sul – official website of the Brazilian Ministry of External Relations (Portuguese)
Orders and Decorations of all Nations by Robert Werlich and Jose Luiz Silva Preiss-Porto Alegre-RS-Brazil

Southern Cross, Order of the
Southern Cross, Order of
Awards established in 1822